In Defence Of Our Earth is an anarcho-punk album, by the band Oi Polloi. It was released in 1990 on Words Of Warning Records.

Track listing
 Thin Green Line
 23 Hours
 When Two Men Kiss
 Whale Song
 What Have We Done?
 Victim Of A Chemical Spillage
 Anarcho-Pie
 Clachan Chalanais
 Free The Henge
 Nazi Scum
 World Park Antarctica

References

1990 albums
Oi Polloi albums